Shupenzë is a village and a former municipality in the Dibër County, eastern Albania. At the 2015 local government reform it became a subdivision of the municipality Bulqizë. The population at the 2011 census was 5,503.

Historical demographics
In 1900, Vasil Kanchov gathered and compiled statistics on demographics in the area and reported the populations of ten villages in the modern municipality, including Bllacë, Boçevë, Homesh ( Omezhe), Kovashicë, Mazhicë, Okshatinë, Shtushaj, Topojan, Vlashaj and Zogjaj. All ten were reported as being Albanian-inhabited, with a total population amongst them of 4080.

References

Former municipalities in Dibër County
Administrative units of Bulqizë
Villages in Dibër County